Philip Schuster may refer to:
 Philip Schuster (gymnast), American gymnast and track and field athlete
 Philip Schuster (physicist), American theoretical elementary particle physicist